Joseph Hyde Potts (1793 – 1865) was an accountant and in 1817 was the first employee to be engaged by the
Bank of New South Wales (now Westpac).

On 9 August 1834 he married Emma Bates (d.1901).  The marriage was conducted by the Rev. William Cowper at fashionable St. Phillip's Church. They had four children: Joseph (b. 1835), Harriet (b. 1837), Francis (b. 1839) and Josephine (b. 1843).

In 1830 Potts acquired  of land from Judge-Advocate John Wylde  on what was previously known as Paddys Point and Woolloomooloo Hill  and renamed it Potts Point. Potts purchased another  in 1834,  in 1835 and a further  in 1835. Potts Hill reservoir and Potts Point are located on a large portion of Joseph Hyde Potts' original land.

In 1841 the Crown granted a further  to Potts, who was at that time Secretary of the Bank of New South Wales, near
where Homebush and Australian Catholic University's Mount Royal College campus is located at Strathfield is today.

References

External links
Paddy's Point or Woolloomooloo Hill

1793 births
1865 deaths
Settlers of Australia
Australian bankers
19th-century Australian businesspeople